The Ode to the Republic of China, also translated as Praise the Republic of China, is a patriotic song of the Republic of China. It is also sung in the People's Republic of China, with some variants in the lyrics. It was written by Liu Chia-chang. Fei Yu-ching and Teresa Teng, among others, have sung this song.

Lyrics

See also
Chinese unification
Cross-Strait relations
One-China policy
Political status of Taiwan
Two Chinas
Zhonghua minzu

References

External links
Music Video on YouTube (Fei Yu-ching version)
Music Video on YouTube (Teresa Teng version)

Mandarin-language songs
Chinese patriotic songs
Year of song missing
Songs about China